James Marion McKee  (February 1, 1947 – September 14, 2002) was an American Major League Baseball pitcher who played for the 1972 and 1973 Pittsburgh Pirates.

An alumnus of Otterbein College, McKee was drafted by the Pittsburgh Pirates in the 4th round of the 1969 amateur draft. He pitched in a total of 17 games for the Pirates, and continued to pitch in their Minor League system until 1974. McKee died as a result of a car accident in 2002 at the age of 55.

References

External links
, or Retrosheet, or Pura Pelota (Venezuelan Winter League)

1947 births
2002 deaths
Baseball players from Columbus, Ohio
Charleston Charlies players
Florida Instructional League Pirates players
Navegantes del Magallanes players
American expatriate baseball players in Venezuela
Otterbein Cardinals baseball players
Pittsburgh Pirates players
Road incident deaths in Ohio
Salem Rebels players
Waterbury Pirates players